The 1928–29 season was Newport County's ninth season in the Football League, eighth season in the Third Division South and ninth season overall in the third tier.

Season review

Results summary

Results by round

Fixtures and results

Third Division South

FA Cup

Welsh Cup

League table

P = Matches played; W = Matches won; D = Matches drawn; L = Matches lost; F = Goals for; A = Goals against; GA = Goal average; Pts = Points

External links
 Newport County 1928-1929 : Results
 Newport County football club match record: 1929
 Welsh Cup 1928/29

1928-29
English football clubs 1928–29 season
1928–29 in Welsh football